Gianluca Litteri (born 6 June 1988) is an Italian footballer  who plays as a striker for  club Catania.

Career
Litteri was signed by Inter in 2006 from Serie D club Giarre, being then loaned out to Slavia Prague during the summer 2008 transfer window. From July 2008 until January 2009 Treviso holds half of player's registration rights before bought back by Inter.

In August 2009, he was loaned to Vicenza. In August 2010 he was loaned out to Salernitana, with an option for his new club to acquire half of the player's rights from Inter.

On 31 January 2019, he signed a 2.5-year contract with Cosenza.

On 7 January 2020, he joined Padova in Serie C on loan with an option to buy.

On 5 October 2020 he moved to Triestina on a two-year contract.

After two seasons with Triestina, on 20 August 2022 he was unveiled as a new signing of newly-refounded Catania for their Serie D campaign.

References

External links
Career profile (from Slavia Prague website, in Czech) 

1988 births
Living people
Footballers from Catania
Footballers from Sicily
Italian footballers
Association football forwards
Serie B players
Serie C players
Inter Milan players
L.R. Vicenza players
U.S. Salernitana 1919 players
Ternana Calcio players
Virtus Entella players
Latina Calcio 1932 players
A.S. Cittadella players
Venezia F.C. players
Cosenza Calcio players
Calcio Padova players
U.S. Triestina Calcio 1918 players
Catania S.S.D. players
Czech First League players
SK Slavia Prague players
Italian expatriate footballers
Expatriate footballers in the Czech Republic
Italian expatriate sportspeople in the Czech Republic